Synechodes lunaris is a moth in the family Brachodidae. It was described by Kallies in 2004. It is found in Malaysia.

The wingspan is 17–18 mm. The forewings are black, with a yellow band from the costa to the anal margin and a patch of yellow
scales near the base. The hindwings are yellow, with a black marginal band.

Etymology
The species name refers to the moon-shaped forewing markings.

References

Natural History Museum Lepidoptera generic names catalog

Brachodidae
Moths described in 2004